United College may refer to:

 United College, St Andrews, Scotland, United Kingdom
 United College, Hong Kong
 United College, Waterloo, Ontario, Canada
 United College, Winnipeg, Manitoba, Canada